Poduridae is a small family of stout-bodied springtails containing only the single genus Podura, and making up the monotypic superfamily Poduroidea. The genus contains four species:
Podura aquatica Linnaeus, 1758
Podura infernalis Motschulski, 1850
† Podura fuscata Koch & Berendt, 1854
† Podura pulchra Koch & Berendt, 1854

References

Springtail genera